Shadi Station is a metro station of Line 2 of the Fuzhou Metro. It is located near Shadi village, Minhou County, Fuzhou, Fujian, China. It started operation on April 26, 2019.

Station layout

Exits

References 

Railway stations in China opened in 2019
Fuzhou Metro stations